Hebron Yeshiva, also known as Yeshivas Hevron, or Knesses Yisroel, is a yeshiva devoted to high-level study of the Talmud. It originated in 1924 when the roshei yeshiva and 150 students of the Slabodka Yeshiva, known colloquially as the "mother of yeshivas", relocated to Hebron.

Relocation of Slabodka Yeshiva to Palestine

A 1924 edict requiring enlistment in the military or supplementary secular studies in the yeshiva led a large number of students in the Slabodka yeshiva to relocate to the Land of Israel, at that time  Palestine under the British mandate. Rabbi Nosson Tzvi Finkel, also known as "Der Alter fun Slabodka" (The Elder of Slabodka), sent Rabbi Avraham Grodzinski to head this group and establish the yeshiva in Hebron. Upon Grodzinski's return to Slabodka, the Alter transferred the mashgiach ruchani responsibilities to him, and the rosh yeshiva duties to Rabbi Yitzchok Isaac Sher, and he moved to Hebron to lead the yeshiva there together with Rabbi Moshe Mordechai Epstein. Hebron was chosen over Jerusalem to avoid the influence of the conservative Old Yishuv. The Slabodka yeshiva in Europe ceased operation during the Holocaust. A branch was also established in Bnei Brak.

1929 Hebron massacre and relocation to Jerusalem

Twenty-four students were murdered in the 1929 Hebron massacre, and the yeshiva was re-established in the Geula neighbourhood of Jerusalem.

Eight of the victims were American citizens who had come to study in the yeshiva from American yeshivas such as Hebrew Theological College, Torah Vodaath and RIETS.

On the day of the 1929 massacre, HaRav Simcha Zissel Broide, who was appointed Rosh Yeshiva in 5721 (1960/61), was not in Chevron.

Despite a delay after the death of Rabbi Moshe Hebroni, the last of the previous generation, the yeshiva moved into a new and larger campus in the south-central Givat Mordechai neighbourhood in 1975. This yeshiva today has about 1300 students and is one of the most prestigious and influential Lithuanian yeshivohs in Israel. The current roshei yeshiva are Rabbi Dovid Cohen and Rabbi Yosef Chevroni.

Prominent alumni 

 Yitzchak Abadi, Rosh Kollel, Kollel Ohel Torah
 Meyer Abovitz, av beis din in Russia
 Yehuda Amit, rosh yeshiva, Kiryat Malakhi
 Yehuda Amital, rosh yeshiva, Yeshivat Har Etzion (Gush Etzion, West Bank)
 Ratzon Arusi
 Eliyahu Bakshi-Doron, Sepharadi Chief Rabbi of Israel
 Menachem Mendel Blachman, Rosh yeshiva, Yeshivat Kerem B'Yavneh (Yavneh, Israel)
 Zvi Block, Talmudic instructor, Mir yeshiva (Brooklyn, New York)
 Simcha Zissel Broide, Rosh Yeshiva
 Meir Chadash, Mashgiach 
 Aryeh Deri, leader of Israeli Shas party
 Menachem Elon, the former Deputy Chief of Israeli Supreme Court
 Baruch Mordechai Ezrachi, rosh yeshiva, Yeshiva Ateres Yisrael, Jerusalem
 Zalman Nechemia Goldberg
 Shlomo Goren, Ashkenazi Chief Rabbi of Israel
 Rene Gutman, Chief Rabbi, Strasbourg, France
 Yeshayahu Hadari, rosh yeshiva, Yeshivat Hakotel (Jerusalem)
 Yitzchak Hutner, rosh yeshiva, Yeshiva Rabbi Chaim Berlin (Brooklyn, New York)
 Shneur Kotler, rosh yeshiva, Beth Medrash Govoha (Lakewood, New Jersey)
 Dov Landau, rosh yeshiva, Slabodka yeshiva (Bnei Brak)
 Michel Yehuda Lefkowitz
 Raphael Pelcovitz, Rabbi Emeritus of the White Shul
 Yitzhak Peretz, Chief Rabbi of Ra'anana
 Aharon Pfeuffer, Rosh Yeshiva in London and Johannesburg, and known for his series on Kashrut
 Aryeh L. Ralbag, CEO of Triangle K Kosher Division (USA)
 Zev Reichman, Talmudic instructor, Yeshiva University (New York)
 Yonatan Shainfeld
 Sholom Schwadron, Haredi rabbi and maggid
 Dov Schwartzman, rosh yeshiva, Yeshivas Beis HaTalmud (Jerusalem)
 Ephraim Azriel Shach
 Avraham Shapira, rosh yeshiva, Mercaz HaRav (Jerusalem)
 Moshe Shapiro, rabbi, Rosh kollel, and Rosh yeshiva, Yeshivas Shev Shmatsa
 Moishe Sternbuch, Vice-President of the Rabbinical Court and the Ra'avad of the Edah HaChareidis (Jerusalem)
 David Yosef
 Moshe Yosef (rabbi)
 Yitzhak Yosef, Sepharadi Chief Rabbi of Israel
 Eliezer Waldenberg

See also
 1929 Hebron massacre
 Kovno Kollel
 Slabodka yeshiva (Bnei Brak)
 Yeshivas Knesses Yisrael (Slabodka)

References

External links

 Yeshiva of Slobodka, YIVO Encyclopedia of Jews in Eastern Europe

Slabodka yeshiva
1924 establishments in Mandatory Palestine
Jews and Judaism in Hebron
Lithuanian-Jewish culture in Israel
Musar movement
Orthodox Judaism in the West Bank
Orthodox yeshivas in Jerusalem

ru:Иешива «Слободка»
yi:סלאבאדקער ישיבה